The Women's 400 metres at the 2010 Commonwealth Games as part of the athletics programme was held at the Jawaharlal Nehru Stadium on Wednesday 6 October till Friday 8 October 2010.

The top four runners in each of the initial five heats plus the next four fastest runners from across the heats also qualified for the semifinals. There were three semifinals, and only the top two from each heat advanced to the final and the two fastest runners.

Records

Heats
First 4 in each heat (Q) and 4 best performers (q) advance to the Semifinals.

Heat 1

Heat 2

Heat 3

Heat 4

Heat 5

Semifinals
First 2 in each heat (Q) and 2 best performers (q) advance to the Final.

Semifinal 1

Semifinal 2

Semifinal 3

Final

External links
2010 Commonwealth Games - Athletics

Women's 400 metres
2010
2010 in women's athletics